Sciots Camp (formerly, Sciot Camp) is a small unincorporated community in El Dorado County, California. The ZIP code is 95610. The community is inside area code 530.

References

Unincorporated communities in California
Unincorporated communities in El Dorado County, California